Timber Timbre is a Canadian music group, featuring Taylor Kirk. The moniker refers to an early series of recordings made in a timber-framed cabin set in the wooded outskirts of Bobcaygeon, Ontario.

History

Timber Timbre released two albums independently before releasing their self-titled album on Out of This Spark in January 2009. They were subsequently signed to Arts & Crafts, who re-released the album on June 30 in Canada and July 28 internationally. The album was named as a longlist nominee for the 2009 Polaris Music Prize on June 15, 2009, and was deemed album of the year by Eye Weekly.

The band's song "Magic Arrow" was featured in the television show Breaking Bad, in the episode "Caballo Sin Nombre", as well as in the TV series The Good Wife, in the episode "Bitcoin for Dummies". "Black Water" features on the soundtrack for the 2012 comedy, For a Good Time, Call..., as well Bottom of the World (2017) and in the TV series Russian Doll (2019). Their song "Demon Host" was featured in the end credits to the 2013 film The Last Exorcism Part II, and in the movie The Gambler (2014).

The band's fourth album, Creep on Creepin' On, was released in April 2011. It was named as one of ten shortlisted nominees for the 2011 Polaris Music Prize that ultimately went to Arcade Fire's The Suburbs. In 2012, the band supported British folk singer Laura Marling on her UK tour and Canadian singer Feist on her tour of America.

The band's fifth record, Hot Dreams, was released April 1, 2014. It was a shortlisted nominee for the 2014 Polaris Music Prize, which eventually went to Tanya Tagaq's Animism. The song "Run From Me" is featured in the Netflix documentary Wild Wild Country, in the sixth season of Orange Is the New Black, in the second season episode of The Blacklist titled "The Mombasa Cartel", and in an episode from the second season of Good Girls called "The Dubby".

Timber Timbre's sixth album, Sincerely, Future Pollution, was released on April 7, 2017, on City Slang Records. The album's first single, "Sewer Blues", was released in January 2017. The second single, "Velvet Gloves & Spit", was released on February 15, 2017.

In 2021, Timber Timbre digitally released an EP titled Dissociation Tapes, Volume 1 previously available on cassette in 2019.

Sound
Timber Timbre's sound has been described as "an aesthetic rooted in swampy, ragged blues" and "beautifully restrained blues from an alternate universe", which creates an atmosphere that is cinematic and spooky.

Members

Current
 Taylor Kirk – vocals, electric guitar, bass guitar, baritone guitar, drums, keyboards
 Simon Trottier – guitar, bass guitar, keyboards	
 Mathieu Charbonneau – keyboards	
 Olivier Fairfield – drums, keyboards

Discography

Albums

EPs 
 I Am Coming to Paris (2016)
 Dissociation Tapes, Volume 1 (2019)

Compilation albums
 Friends in Bellwoods II (2009): "Water"

Other credits
Kirk and Trottier have also produced albums for other artists, including the full-length debut album by Tasseomancy.

References

External links
 
 
 

Musical groups established in 2005
Musical groups from Toronto
Musical groups from Montreal
Canadian folk rock groups
Arts & Crafts Productions artists
2005 establishments in Ontario
Canadian indie folk groups
City Slang artists